"(Rock) Superstar" is the second single from Cypress Hill's fifth studio album Skull & Bones. It was originally released as a double A-side with its standard rap counterpart on February 29, 2000 in the UK. An individual release was available starting sometime in April.

Music video
The song's music video is very similar to the previous single, "(Rap) Superstar", with the man picking up a ticket that says "Rock Superstar" on it. After giving the ticket to Sen Dog, the man enters into a fun house. A group of women dress up the man in a suit, before he wanders off. After seeing a testimony on a TV screen from Everlast, he encounters many record executives. At the video's climax, the man is chased out after going to a performance by Cypress Hill. As the man exits the fun house, it blows up behind him.

Coal Chamber bassist Nadja Peulen appears in a cameo as the bass player of the band performing at the song's climax.

Use in other media
The song is featured in the 2001 film Training Day. It was also in the film Little Nicky.

The song is featured in the 2000 video game MTV Sports: Skateboarding featuring Andy Macdonald, released on PC and various consoles.

The instrumental is used as an intro at the beginning of each hour on the nationally syndicated radio and television sports talk show The Dan Patrick Show, and is also used in a small game called Alien Battlecraft Arena.

The song is featured twice in the American Dad! episode "The Boring Identity". The first is when Steve becomes a paperboy and is introduced to their best worker, Roger. The second time is during a montage of the two "hustling" to earn extra money.

Track listing

Charts

Notes

A  "(Rap) Superstar" and "(Rock) Superstar" were released together as a double A-side single in the United Kingdom.

References

2000 singles
2000 songs
Columbia Records singles
Cypress Hill songs
Nu metal songs
Songs written by B-Real
Songs written by DJ Muggs
Songs written by Sen Dog
Song recordings produced by DJ Muggs